Phil Haynes (born 1961 in Hillsboro, Oregon) is an American jazz percussionist and composer.

Career
A veteran artist based in New York for 25 years, Phil Haynes is featured on more than 85 LP, CD, and DVD releases by numerous American and European record labels.  Haynes’ debut, The Paul Smoker Trio’s QB with Anthony Braxton, was named the #1 recording of 1985 by esteemed critic Kevin Whitehead. The international media have compared his drumming to masters Jack DeJohnette, Roy Haynes, + Elvin Jones, and his compositions to Duke Ellington, Charles Ives, Charles Mingus and the Art Ensemble of Chicago. Haynes' performances were recently noted to be “The perfect middle between tradition and avant-garde, between power and sophistication, between accessibility and adventure. . . standards with a new sense of drama, dynamics, and true moments of fun.” 

In addition to the critically acclaimed three recordings for Enja Records by the composer’s collective, "Joint Venture" (w/Paul Smoker, Ellery Eskelin, + Drew Gress), Haynes’ diverse and distinctive dozen recordings as a leader include: "Continuum" (violinist Mark Feldman’s jazz debut); the ground breaking and iconic "4 Horns & What?"; his first recording of jazz standards, "A Couch in Brooklyn" (featuring Israeli born pianist Micu Narununsky and bassist Drew Gress); "The Hammond Insurgency" with B-3 organ virtuoso Jeff Palmer; "Free Country’s" trilogy of Americana (w/ cellist/vocalist Hank Roberts & guitarist Jim Yanda); the singular solo drum-set recording, "Sanctuary," as well as "No Fast Food," his defining modernist saxophone trio featuring NEA jazz master David Liebman.

Moving to central Pennsylvania in 2003, Haynes founded the nationally noted Jazz@Bucknell chamber series, in 2005, and was subsequently appointed as Bucknell University’s first Kushell Jazz Artist-in-Residence. From 2007-2012, Haynes taught courses in Jazz History, directed his multi-media/new music Bucknell Interdisciplinary Improvisation Ensemble (BIIE), coached the University Jazz Band rhythm section and soloists, worked with various small ensembles and recitalists, maintained a vigorous private studio, and led the 'Bison Band. Later years featured appointments as interim Director of Jazz Studies for both Susquehanna University, PA, and Nazareth College, NY.

Artists Haynes has appeared on CD include Theo Bleckman, Anthony Braxton, Adam Caine, Joe Daley, Dave Douglas, Mark Dresser, Marty Ehrlich, Ellery Eskelin, Mark Feldman, Ken Filiano, Vinny Golia, Drew Gress, Mark Helias, Lindsay Horner, Ed Jackson, Ritsu Katsumata, David Kikoski, Frank Lacy, Andy Laster, David Liebman, Tony Malaby, Denman Maroney, Michael McNeill, Micu Narunsky, Jeff Palmer, Hank Roberts, Herb Robertson, Ned Rothenberg, Rich Rothenberg, Ted Rosenthal, Michelle Rosewoman, Steve Rudolph, Steve Salerno, Ed Schuller, Paul Smoker, Michael Stevens, David Taylor, Andreas Willers, Gebhard Ullmann, and Tom Varner.

Other diverse performers that Haynes has appeared with in concert include John Abercrombie, Ralph Alessi, Tim Berne, Bobby Bradford, Don Byron, Bill Carrothers, Billy Childs, Marilyn Crispell, Joshua Davis, Jack Dejohnette, Bill Dobbins, Marty Ehrlich, Jon English, Michael Formanek, Joel Frahm, Charles Gayle, Steve Gilmore, Ben Goldberg, Arnold Hammerschlag, Peter Herbert, Ingrid Jensen, Dean Johnson, David Liebman, Albert Manglesdorf, Tony Marino, Ron McClure, Tony Micelli, Ben Monder, Glenn Moore, Varden Ovsepian, Paul Plimley, Steve Rudolph, Eddie Severn, Louis Sclavis, Leni Stern, John Stowell, John Swana, Steve Swell, Greg Tardy, John Tchicai, Gary Thomas, Thomas Ullrich, Roseanna Vitro, J.D. Waters, Tim Warfield, Kenny Werner, Kenny Wheeler, Larry Willis and Andrea Wolper.

In addition to his "Sanctuary" solo concert presentations + duet performances with David Liebman and Herb Robertson, current Haynes touring ensembles include his: romantic, folk-Americana string band, 'Free Country' (featuring cellist/vocalist Hank Roberts, guitarist Jim Yanda, + bassist Drew Gress); the modernist saxophone trio, 'No Fast Food' (w/bass titan Drew Gress and NEA jazz master David Liebman); as well as the classic piano trio, 'Day Dream' (w/pianist Steve Rudolph & Drew Gress).

https://www.philhaynes.com/

https://philhaynesmusic.bandcamp.com/music

https://www.cornerstorejazz.com/

Discography

As leader
 "Continuum: the Passing" (Owl, 1991)
 "4 Horns & What?" (Open Minds, 1991)
 "4 Horn Lore" (Open Minds, 1992)
 "Ritual" duets w/ Herb Robertson (CIMP, 2000)
 "Free Country" the eponymous debut (Premonition, 2000)
 "Brooklyn-Berlin" quintet led w/ Herb Robertson (CIMP, 2000)
 "The Way the West Was Won" by Free Country (CornerStoreJazz, 2010)
 "Sanctuary" for solo drum set (CornerStoreJazz, 2013) 
 "It Might Be Spring" duets w/ Paul Smoker (Alvas/CornerStoreJazz, 2013)
 "Together / Workin' It" by No Fast Food (CornerStoreJazz, 2014)
 "'60 / '69: My Favorite Things" by Free Country (CornerStoreJazz, 2018)
 "Settings for Three" by No Fast Food (CornerStoreJazz, 2018)
 "Live at the Brooklyn Academy of Music" by 4 Horns & What? (CornerStoreJazz, 2023)

With Joint Venture
 Joint Venture (Enja, 1987)
 Ways (Enja, 1990)
 Mirrors (Enja, 1993)

As sideman
With Paul Smoker
 QB (Alvas, 1984)
 Mississippi River Rat (Sound Aspects, 1985)
 Alone (Sound Aspects, 1988)
 Come Rain or Come Shine (Sound Aspects, 1989)
 Genuine Fables (Hat ART, 1993)
 Halloween '96 (CIMP, 1997)
 Halloween the Sequel (Nine Winds, 1998)
 Brass Reality (Nine Winds, 2002)
 Cool Lives (Alvas, 2012)
 Landings (Alvas, 2013)

With Gebhard Ullmann
 Trad Corrosion (Nabel, 1995)
 Basement Research (Soul Note, 1995)
 Kreuzberg Park East (Soul Note, 2000)
 Live in Munster (Not Two, 2007)

With others
 Mark Dresser, Force Green (Soul Note, 1995)
 Drew Gress & Steve Rudolph, "Day Dream" (PACT, 
 Ellery Eskelin, Setting the Standard (Cadence, 1989)
 Ellery Eskelin, Forms (Open Minds, 1991)
 Andy Laster, Hippo Stomp (Sound Aspects, 1989)
 Andy Laster, Twirler (Sound Aspects, 1990)
 Herb Robertson, Certified (JMT, 1991)
 Herb Robertson, Ritual (CIMP, 2000)
 Steve Rudolph, "Day Dream" (PACT, 2009)
 Steve Rudolph, "Originals" (PACT, 2019)
 Dave Taylor, Past Tells (New World, 1993)
 Jake Wark, "Tremors" (CornerStoreJazz, 2016)
 Tom Varner, Long Night Big Day (New World, 1991)
 Jim Yanda, "Regional Cookin'" (CornerStoreJazz, 2013
 Jim Yanda, "Home Road" (CornerStoreJazz, 2016)
 Jim Yanda, "A Silent Way" (CornerStoreJazz, 2020)

References

1961 births
Musicians from Hillsboro, Oregon
Living people
Date of birth missing (living people)